Mela Tenenbaum, (Ukrainian: Мела Тененбаум) born in Ukraine, is a classical violinist and violist, also playing viola d'amore. She graduated from the Kyiv Conservatory and performed the Kyiv Philharmonic and other orchestras. She inspired composers such as Dmitri Klebanov to write pieces for her.

She emigrated to the United States and was from the early 1990s concertmaster of the Philharmonia Virtuosi. She recorded works from Vivaldi to salon music, especially chamber music.

Career 

Tenenbaum studied music at the Kyiv Conservatory and obtained a master's degree. She performed with the Kyiv Chamber Orchestra and the Kyiv Philharmonic from 1979. She was also a soloist and concertmaster with the chamber orchestra Perpetuum Mobile, an ensemble supported by the Ukrainian Union of Composers. Several Russian and Ukrainian composers wrote works for her which she premiered. Dmitri Klebanov composed for her pieces such as a viola concerto and Japanese Silhouettes for soprano, viola d'amore and a mixed ensemble of thirteen players.

In 1990, she emigrated to the United States. She has been the concertmaster of the chamber orchestra Philharmonia Virtuosi, founded and conducted by Richard Kapp, from 1993. (Other sources give 1989 as the time of immigration and 1991 as year of appointment.) From 1992, she was the concertmaster for choral concerts of the community chorus The Master Singers of Westchester in the Bedford Presbyterian Church, Bach's Mass in B minor in 2003 and Mozart's Great Mass in C minor in 2007. She has been on the faculty of the Killington Music Festival, and has lectured at the Metropolitan Museum of Art and the Smithsonian Institution.

Recording 

Tenenbaum recorded among others Bach's sonatas and partitas, Locatelli's Art of the Violin, Mozart's violin concertos, and Beethoven's Violin Concerto. She recorded Vivaldi's concerto for four violins in B-flat, RV 553, with her husband Alexander playing 2nd violin. She is known for also playing salon repertory, such as works for violin and piano recorded as Songs Without Words with pianist Kapp, by composers such as Fritz Kreisler and Henryk Wieniawski. A reviewer compared her to Jascha Heifetz and noted: 

In 1995, she recorded music she played on the Queen Elizabeth 2 with pianist Anton Nel, titled "Tea Time on the QE2". She recorded a viola recital, again with Kapp, of transcriptions and original pieces, Chausson's Pièce pour alto et piano, Op. 39, and Henri Vieuxtemps' Caprice from Hommage à Paganini, Op. 9. A reviewer described her playing of two Hungarian Dances "spontaneous and uninhibited, dramatic with an exciting touch of recklessness". In 1997, she recorded Klebanov's viola concerto and Japanese Silhouettes, a "unique combination of song cycle and viola d'amore concerto", with soprano Natalia Biorro and Kapp conducting the Philharmonia Virtuosi.

References

External links 

 
 Mela Tenenbaum arkivmusic.com
 Ekkard Seidl: CD Aufnahmen meiner Instrumente seidlgeigen.com 
 Sonatas and Partitas for Solo Violin jsbach.org
 Fred Flaxman: ESS.A.Y Recordings compactdiscoveries.com 1998

Ukrainian classical violinists
American classical violinists
Ukrainian classical violists
American classical violists
Women violists
Concertmasters
Ukrainian SSR emigrants to the United States
Living people
Year of birth missing (living people)
Place of birth missing (living people)
Kyiv Conservatory alumni
20th-century classical violinists
21st-century classical violinists
Women classical violinists
20th-century American women musicians
21st-century American women musicians
20th-century American violinists
21st-century American violinists
20th-century violists
21st-century violists